The Hadith of Najd is a hadith in Sahih Bukhari with several chains of narration about three geographical locations, one of which is prophesied to be the source of calamities. Sunni Muslims accept that the classification of the hadith as "sahih" (authentic).

Text of the hadith
According to two narrations in Sahih Bukhari, Prophet Muhammad asks Allah to bless the areas of Bilad al-Sham (Syria) and Yemen.  When his companions said "Our Najd as well," he replied: There will appear earthquakes and afflictions, and from there will come out the side of the head (i.e. horns) of Satan. 
In a similar narration, Muhammad again asked Allah to bless the areas Medina, Mecca, Sham, and Yemen and, when asked specifically to bless Najd, repeated similar comments about there being earthquakes, trials, tribulations, and the horns of Satan.
"O Allaah bestow your blessings on our Shaam. O Allaah bestow your blessings on our Yemen." The people said, "O Messenger of Allaah, and our Najd." I think the third time the Prophet, sallallaahu alayhi wa sallam, said, "There (in Najd) will occur earthquakes, trials and tribulations, and from there appears the Horn of Satan."

It has been asserted that this hadith is relating the coming events that shook the Muslim nation, these known as fitnah or 'trials'. It has also been identified as where the Dajjal or Antichrist is said to emerge from (according to a narration through Imam Nawawi). There have also been various theories instigated against the people of the modern day region of Saudi Arabia known as 'Najd', however, linguistical and geographically this argument is disputed.

Location of Najd
The Arabic word Najd generally means a highland. It can also refer, as a proper noun, to the region of Najd in Saudi Arabia. Some medieval Islamic scholars, who lived before the Wahhabi movement originating in the 18th century CE, wrote different interpretations of what this hadith could be referring to. Contemporarily, this hadith is widely understood to refer to the Wahhabi movement. 
Some scholars dispute this claim.
Possible locations listed are the areas around Yemen, Iraq, and Saudi Arabia.
Ibn Hajar al-Asqalani said after quoting the words of al-Khattaabee explaining the meaning of Qarn (horn) ;
 "and others have said that the People of the East were disbelievers at that time and the Messenger of Allaah, sallallaahu alayhi wa sallam, informed us that the trials and tribulations would arise from that direction and it was as he said. And the first of the trials that arose, arose from the direction of the east and they were the reason for the splitting of the Muslim ranks, and this is what Satan loves and delights in. Likewise, the innovations appeared from that direction."

Ibn Hajr quoted al-Khattabi as saying:

 "The najd is in the direction of the east, and for the one who is in Madeenah then his Najd would be the desert of Iraaq and its regions for this is to the east of the People of Madeenah. The basic meaning of Najd is that which is raised/elevated from the earth in contravention to al-Gawr for that is what is lower than it. Tihaamah [the coastal plain along the south-western and southern shores of the Arabian Peninsula] is entirely al-Gawr and Mecca is in Tihaamah.'[...] by this [saying of al-Khattaabee] the weakness of the saying of ad-Daawodee is understood that 'Najd is in the direction of Iraq' [min Nahiya al-Iraq] for he suggests that Najd is a specific place. This is not the case, rather everything that is elevated with respect to what adjoins it is called Najd and the lower area called Gawr."

The celebrated 12th-century historian Ali ibn al-Athir, who had frequently traveled to Iraq during the era of Saladin and had written his monumental work al-Kamil fi at-Tarikh (The Complete History), writes in his work 'al-Nihâyah' ;

 "Najd is the highland region. This name is given to area beyond the Hijâz towards Iraq".

It is also related that Imam Nawawi in his Sharh Saheeh Muslim 2/29 stated that this hadith had to with the Dajjal or Antichrist coming from the East.

Contemporary theories
Traditional Sunni Scholars view

A number of authors have claimed that the hadith refers to Muhammad ibn Abd al-Wahhab, the patronym of the Wahhabi movement. It is accounted that the origin of Muhammad ibn Abd al-Wahhab is from the modern day Najd region of Saudi Arabia which happens to be the only surviving region that carried on the title of 'Najd' after the geographical codification regardless that there were several distinct locations known previously as 'Najd'. 
This theory is generally accepted by number of scholars from Sunni movement including Barelvi Movement and reputed Al-Azhar University scholars, they identified Wahhabism as the predicted "Horn of the Devil", or the Islamic Dajjal.

However evidence can be cited from the cluster of hadiths which identify the miqat points for pilgrims. In a hadith narrated by Imam Nasa’i (Manasik al-Hajj, 22), 'A’isha (r.a.) declared that 'Allah's Messenger (s.w.s.) established the miqat for the people of Madina at Dhu’l-Hulayfa, for the people of Syria and Egypt at al-Juhfa, for the people of Iraq at Dhat Irq, and for the people of Najd at Qarn, and for the Yemenis at Yalamlam.' Imam Muslim (Hajj, 2) narrates a similar hadith: 'for the people of Madina it is Dhu’l-Hulayfa – while on the other road it is al-Juhfa – for the people of Iraq it is Dhat Irq, for the people of Najd it is Qarn, and for the people of Yemen it is Yalamlam.' These texts constitute unarguable proof that the Prophet (s.w.s.) distinguished between Najd and Iraq, so much so that he appointed two separate miqat points for the inhabitants of each. For him, clearly, Najd did not include Iraq.

Ibn 'Abd al-Barr (368h-463h) was quoted as saying:
"Allah knows best that the reason behind pointing of Prophet peace be upon him towards east regarding fitna is that the biggest fitna which was the key of troubles was the martyrdom of Uthman ibn Affan may Allah be pleased with him, and that was the reason behind the war of Jamal and Siffeen, these troubles started from the east. Then Khawarij emerged from the land of Najd, Iraq and its regions." Many modern Salafi deny this, since it would condemn their own ideology, and instead claim that it is referring to Iraq. It is notable that Iraq is not a highland, but an alluvial plain.

Wahhabi view 
Contrary, advocates of Wahhabism consider the Banu Tamim tribe of Muhammad ibn Abd al-Wahhab, in the present-day Saudi Arabia, as the only one, who will resist the Dajjal, citing certain scholarly works, such as the Musnad of Ahmad ibn Hanbal: "Do not say of Banu Tamim anything but good, for indeed they are the severest of people in attacking the Dajjaal." Further, the Ibn Hajar praises the Banu Tamim in his Tafsir: "I have loved the people of the tribe of Banu Tamim, ever since I heard three things the Messenger of Allaah, sallallaahu alayhi wa sallam, said about them. I heard him saying, 'these people (of the tribe of Banu Tamim) would stand firm against the Dajjaal.' When the Saddaqat from that tribe came, the Messenger of Allaah, sallallaahu alayhi wa sallam, said, "these are the Saddaqat (charitable gifts) of our folk." Aa'ishah had a slave girl from that tribe, and the Prophet, sallallaahu alayhi wa sallam, said to Aa'ishah, 'manumit her as she is a descendant of Ismaa'eel, alayhis salaam."

See also 
Invasion of Najd
Memoirs of Mr. Hempher, The British Spy to the Middle East
Fitnat al-Wahhabiyya

External links
 Puncturing the Devil's Dream About the Hadiths of Najd and Tamim - Masud.co.uk

References

Hadith
Islamic eschatology
Satan